Håkan Andersson, nicknamed Håkan Bråkan, is the younger brother of Sune Andersson, the main character in the Swedish Sune series, a series of books. Sune finds Håkan very annoying, having given him the nickname "Håkan Bråkan" which roughly translates to Håkan the Troublemaker.

Since 1998, these are also spin-off-books with Håkan as the main character. In December 2003, Håkan became the main character in Sveriges Television's Christmas calendar, a TV-series with the same name.

Spinoff books

References

External links
 Känner du familjen Andersson? 

Child characters in literature
Male characters in literature
Literary characters introduced in 1983
Spin-offs
Book series introduced in 1998